Bromheadia brevifolia is a small epiphytic orchid species in the genus Bromheadia. It is native to the Malay Peninsula, where it is found in the Malaysian states of Pahang and Perak, and on the island of Borneo in the Malaysian states of Sabah and Sarawak, as well as in Brunei. The length of its stems are covered by the leaf sheaths. The flower is white or pale yellow with brighter yellow and violet bars on the labellum.

References

External links 

Adrorhizinae
Flora of Brunei
Orchids of Borneo
Orchids of Malaysia
Plants described in 1896